Prakash Nikki is an Indian film score and soundtrack composer.

Career 
Prakash made his breakthrough as a music composer through Rowthiram (2011), where his song "Maalai Mangum Neram" became popular.  His second film composed was the horror-thriller, Kalam (2016).

In 2013, Prakash composed the festival anthem for the 11th Chennai International Film Festival which was sung by Andrea Jeremiah, Vallavan and Yuki.

Discography

References

Indian male playback singers
Indian male composers
Living people
Musicians from Chennai
Tamil film score composers
Tamil musicians
Telugu film score composers
Male film score composers
Year of birth missing (living people)